Crustomyces is a genus of fungi in the family Cystostereaceae. The widespread genus contains three species.

References

External links

Cystostereaceae
Polyporales genera
Fungi described in 1978
Taxa named by Walter Jülich